The Shivleni Caves (Shiva leni; Jogai Mandap; Hattikhana) in Ambajogai, Maharashtra, India are rock-cut cave monuments which date in King Udayaditya (reigned c. 1060–1087) from Paramara dynasty of Malwa. Total excavations were hewn out of rock cut and carved deep inside the hill. The caves include sculptures of Hindu deities like Shiva, Saptamatrukas and Ganesha.

The site is listed in "List of State Protected Monuments in Maharashtra" as a protected monument in the care of the Department of Archaeology of Maharashtra, under the Maharashtra Ancient Monuments and Archeological Sites and Remains Act, 1960. The Shivleni Caves have also been an Archaeological Survey of India Heritage Site.

Description
Shivleni Caves are situated hardly half a kilometer to the north-west of Yogeshvari Temple, along the banks of the Jayvanti river. The caves are square in shape and are carved deep inside the hill.  The entrance is on the southern side of the hill. Inside Mandap (pavilion) has an 8.36 sq m. court-yard in front and the roof of Mandap is supported by four pillars.

Interiors
In the centre of the courtyard there is an elegantly carved Nandi Mandap measuring 9.14 × 9.14 meters.  In the center of this Mandap there is an image of Nandi. The inside of the cave is impressive; one hall is supported by thirty-two pillars and adorned with sculptures of Shiva and Ganesha.

An account of this structure can be found in the book The Cave Temples of India by James Fergusson and James Burgess (1880).

History and inscription
An inscription found here dated Saka 1066 records the grant for the maintenance of these caves by the king Udayaditya who is referenced as "Mahamandaleshvar". According to the inscription, villages of Sailu, Kumbhephal, Javalganv and a few others were granted to the Shiva temple. This inscription has been relocated to the Tahsildar's office at Ambajogai for safe custody and preservation.

Local beliefs
A local story claims that the monument is the wedding court of the jogaidevi, whose temple is situated nearby. It is said that the wedding was planned to take place in this mandap but could not take place for supernatural reasons,  and the elephants and everything inside it turned to stone, hence the name 'Jogai Mandap'.

There is also a local belief that there is a tunnel in this Hattikhana leading to Parli Vaijanath, around 25 km away, that was closed by the authorities.

Protection
The monument is now a state protected monument under the Maharashtra Ancient Monuments and Archaeological Sites and Remains Act, 1960.

See also

References

Archaeological sites in Maharashtra
Caves of Maharashtra
Beed district
Caves containing pictograms in India
Indian rock-cut architecture
History of Maharashtra
Former populated places in India
Shiva temples in India
Hindu cave temples in India
Hindu temples in Maharashtra
Tourist attractions in Beed district
Tourist attractions in Maharashtra